Middlemore railway station is on the Southern Line and Eastern Line of the Auckland railway network in New Zealand. The station has side platforms on the northbound and southbound lines connected by a pedestrian level crossing at the south end of the platforms. Access to the station is via Hospital Road: it is next to Middlemore Hospital.

Upgrade 

In September 2007, Counties Manukau District Health Board, ARTNL and ARTA opened a new railway footbridge and staff walkway at the station. The footbridge provides safer access to Middlemore Hospital from the staff carpark.

Services
Auckland One Rail, on behalf of Auckland Transport, operates suburban services to Britomart, Manukau, Papakura and Pukekohe via Middlemore. The typical weekday off-peak timetable is:
6 tph to Britomart, consisting of:
3 tph via Glen Innes (Eastern Line)
3 tph via Penrose and Newmarket (Southern Line)
3 tph to Manukau
3 tph to Papakura

Bus routes 314 and 321 serve Middlemore Station.

See also 
 List of Auckland railway stations

References 

Rail transport in Auckland
Railway stations in New Zealand